DivX Plus HD, launched in 2009, is the brand name for the file type that DivX, Inc. has chosen for their high definition video format. DivX Plus HD files consist of high definition H.264/MPEG-4 AVC video with surround sound Advanced Audio Coding (AAC) audio, wrapped up in the open-standard Matroska container, identified by the .mkv file extension. DivX Plus HD files leverage and extend on Matroska's ability to support multiple language tracks, subtitles, chapters, and additional bonus content.

DivX Plus HD products

Software 

As of the release of DivX 7, DivX Plus HD support has been included in the main software bundle.

On 16 March 2010, DivX released DivX Plus Software (version 8) for Windows which included:
 DivX Plus Player - Play DivX 6 files (.avi and .divx with MP3 audio) and DivX Plus HD (.mkv with AAC audio)
 DivX to Go - A device transfer wizard for moving videos to DivX devices via USB or optical disc
 DivX Plus Converter - Creates .mkv files via the "DivX Plus HD" menu or converts .mkv to .divx
 DivX Plus Web Player - Plays .mkv files with H.264 video and AAC audio on web pages inside a web browser.
 DivX Plus Codec Pack - DirectShow components for decoding and creating DivX and DivX Plus video files
 DXVA for H.264 video - Optional hardware acceleration components for H.264 video on supported graphics cards
 DivX Plus Tech Preview: MKV on Windows 7 - An MKV-playback component for Windows 7 that leverages Microsoft Media Foundation framework

DivX Plus HD Profile
DivX has defined profiles which are subsets of MPEG-4/AVI and H264/MKV standards. Because the grouping is a specific subset of what is in the standards, there are certification processes for each of the profiles that device manufacturers must follow. Below is the DivX Plus HD profile.

All DivX Plus HD certified devices bearing a DivX Plus logo will adhere to the profile outlined in the table below, as would any tools that support the DivX profiles. DivX Plus HD devices are also tested for compliance against the DivX HD 1080p profile for MPEG4/AVI certification in order to maintain backwards compatibility

MKV Extensions
DivX has introduced additional features beyond the Matroska specification that are implemented during the video file creation process and exposed during playback in DivX Plus software and on consumer electronics devices certified for DivX Plus HD. Below are the standard and extended MKV features that are specific to the DivX Plus HD profile.

World Fonts
Currently, font files can be easily attached to .mkv files using a Matroska mux, but certain problems may arise when attempting to utilize a font during playback.  Usually, performance is affected because the font file can be large and take time to load for the subtitles. The DivX Plus Word Fonts extension attempts to solve this problem by optimizing the font file during the file creation stage. A DivX Plus mux, like the DivXMKVMux, can examine the subtitle file, determine which characters are required from a font file, and repack the font file for attachment with only the necessary symbols, thereby reducing the font attachment size and decreasing the time it needs to load.

Smooth FF/RW
DivX has released a specification for a DivX Plus extension that aims to improve seeking quickly through a video file, either forward or backward. Called Smooth FF/RW, the creator of the video creates a lower resolution version of the video that is attached to the .mkv file and leveraged whenever a user instructs their player to seek fast forward or rewind. When the user presses fast forward or rewind, the full resolution track is swapped out with the lower resolution version, requiring less resources; when the user presses play, the lower resolution track is instantly swapped out to the full resolution version, which is intended to solve inaccurate seeking issues or a stuttering effect during fast forward and rewind.

Multi-title Play
Episodic content can be packaged into a single file.

Authored and Auto-generated Chapters
Access to chapter points in a video when no chapter information exists.

Quick Start
The format supports quick start where the user can begin viewing even large HD files immediately.

Hardware
The following chips have been certified or have licensing agreements for DivX Plus HD:

NEC Electronics has signed a multi-year licensing agreement to include DivX Plus HD in its EMMA chips.

Consumer electronics
The following products have been DivX Plus HD Certified:

x264 compatibility
According to documentation provided by DivX on their DivX Developer Portal, it is possible to make DivX Plus HD compatible files via other H.264 encoders, such as the open source x264 encoder.  At minimum, the following command line creates an H.264 bitstream within the DivX Plus HD profile:
x264 --vbv-maxrate=20000 --vbv-bufsize=25000 --level 40 --bframes 3 --keyint <4*FPS> -o <output file> <input file>

Despite the popular transcoding tool HandBrake dropping .avi container support, it can still be used to create DivX Plus compatible videos if MKV is selected for format, x264 is selected for video codec, AAC is used for audio codec, and the following options are passed into the advanced settings:
level=40:ref=2:bframes=2:subq=6:mixed-refs=0:weightb=0:8x8dct=0:trellis=0:vbv-maxrate=20000:vbv-bufsize=25000:weightp=0

See also
 Comparison of container formats

References

External links
 DivX Developer Portal
 DivX Labs
 x264 at VideoLAN.org
 StaxRip at Sourceforge.net
 RipBot264 at Doom9.org

Video codecs